Sierra Leone is a country located in West Africa, known officially as the Republic of Sierra Leone.

Government of Sierra Leone

The government of Sierra Leone is the governing authority of the Republic of Sierra Leone, as established by the Sierra Leone Constitution. The Sierra Leone government is divided into three branches: the executive, legislative and the judicial. The seat of government of Sierra Leone is in the capital Freetown.

Administrative divisions 

Sierra Leone is divided into provinces, districts, and chiefdoms. Sierra Leone has 3 rural provinces, plus a capital city administrative province. There are then 14 districts - 12 rural, 2 for the capital Freetown.

Sierra Leone is further divided into 149 chiefdoms. The chiefdoms are hereditary, tribal units of local governance. The World Bank sponsored the creation of elected local councils in 2004.

Political parties and elections

Presidential elections

Parliamentary elections

See also
List of ambassadors of Sierra Leone to Germany
List of ambassadors of Sierra Leone to Russia
Sierra Leone presidents and head of state by tribes

References

External links
Office of the Sierra Leone President
Sierra Leone Government
Special Court for Sierra Leone
Truth and Reconciliation Commission

Elections
African Elections Database
https://books.google.com/books?id=jj4J-AXGDaQC&pg=PA983&lpg=PA983&dq=state+avenue+state+house+in+freetown+closed+to+public&source=bl&ots=JIlbx4olxv&sig=HFzmpvbA28Y_pq80DGPuaXG_nQo&hl=en&ei=j5ykTeuOIMaw0QHjrp2DCQ&sa=X&oi=book_result&ct=result&resnum=1&ved=0CBgQ6AEwAA#v=onepage&q&f=false